In German,  ("Kevinism") is the negative preconception German people have of Germans with trendy, exotic-sounding first names considered to be an indicator of a low social class. The protypical example is Kevin, which like most such names came to Germany from Anglo-American culture. Sometimes  ("Chantalism") is used as a female equivalent, from the French name Chantal.

Overview
The question as to whether parents of lower socioeconomic status tend more to give their children exotic or Anglo-American names has various answers. This topic has been discussed among German sociologists from completely opposite points of view. However, there is no definitive statistic on the topic so far. On account of the unusual and sudden popularity of the name, the term Kevinism (or Chantalism after the female given name Chantal) for this cliché was first created by the satire-website Uncyclopedia, and was subsequently picked up by journalists and made into a topic of discussion.

According to a master's thesis authored at the University of Oldenburg in 2009, certain given names of students can indeed lead to prejudices on the part of teachers. For example, the name Kevin (an anglicised name of Irish origin), given to a German child, indicates to German teachers that such a student is prone to attention-seeking behaviour, as well as lower scholastic performance, and is also indicative of a lower socioeconomic status. It was not possible to determine whether this also causes a student to be treated less well. Prejudice of this type is understood to be more prevalent amongst teachers in Western Germany. English or otherwise exotic given names are often understood/stigmatised in the old states of Germany to be typical "Ossi". In fact, English given names in East Germany were particularly popular in the two decades preceding German reunification. There, this trend was also popular amongst the middle class, while the preference for such given names today, particularly in Western Germany, is perceived as a lower class phenomenon.

According to a 2012 study by Leipzig linguist Gabriele Rodriguez, "Kevinism" given names (in Germany) such as Mandy, Peggy or Kevin have an undeservedly bad reputation. Statistics analysed by her former students at the Leipzig University prove, according to this name expert, that, by now, there are many college and university graduates bearing such names. Amongst German academics with the given name Kevin found in the aforementioned data set from Leipzig University, one could see doctorate-degreed chemists, theologians and Germanists.

The word "Alpha-Kevin" (combination of Alpha male and the given name), as being representative of a particularly unintelligent young person, was, for a time, at the top of the list, which was the subject of a 2015 online poll for the German Word of the Year and, particularly, the youth word of the year. However, it was struck from the list of suggestions on account of being discriminatory to people bearing the name Kevin. The phenomenon in Germany, especially during limited periods of time, that particularly popular given names are associated with negative prejudices, at times, to the point of being used as swear words, is not new from a linguistic perspective. In the past, this was the case, as an example, for given names including Horst, Detlef, Uschi (German short form of Ursula) and Heini (German short form of Heinrich). 

The onomatologist and linguist Damaris Nübling spoke at a September 2015 convention on the topic of "given names as social markers" about a "smear campaign" having been waged against given names (in Germany) such as Kevin and Chantal and criticised the rhetoric concerning such given names as being "very cheap polemic".

References

External links
Stupedia article on German Kevinism

German culture
German humour
Germanic names
German words and phrases
Social class in Germany
Prejudices
Anti-American sentiment in Germany
Stereotypes of the working class